Julma Satu is the debut album of the Finnish power metal band Villieläin. It was released on 19 August 2009 on the Universal Music Group label. It reached position 27 on the Finnish top 40 album charts, where it stayed for one week.

Track listing 

"Voimat Villieläimen" (Powers of the Wild Animal) 
"Kaiverrettu Hiekkaan" (Engraved In Sand)
"Rakkautta Vai Kuolemaa" (Love or Death)
"Voittamaton" (Invincible)
"Kuoleman Suudelma" (The Kiss of Death)
"Kostonenkeli" (Angel of Revenge)
"Veren Silta" (Bridge of Blood)
"Kauneimman Lauluni"(My Most Beautiful Song)
"Yön Kuningatar" (Queen of the Night)
"Kuuletko Kutsun" (Can You Hear the Call)
"Ihminen Ei Osaa Rakastaa" (Human Can't Love)

Songwriters 
 Jani Hölli (Soulrelic, Snakegod)
 Piritta "Lumous" Vartola (Manzana)
 Aksu Hanttu (Entwine)
 Tommy Suomala (Soulrelic)
 Raymond Pohjola (Soulrelic)
 Anna-Eerika Guzejev (Dean)
 Petri Alanko

Villieläin albums
2009 albums